The Roman Catholic Diocese of Ełk is a diocese located in the city of Ełk in the Ecclesiastical province of Warmia in Poland.

History
 March 25, 1992: Established as Diocese of Ełk from the Diocese of Łomża and Diocese of Warmia

Special churches
 Cathedral:  Katedra św. Wojciecha, Ełk (St. Wojciech Cathedral)
 Co-Cathedral:  Konkatedra NMP Matki Kościoła, Gołdap (Our Lady Mother of Church Concathedral)
 Co-Cathedral:  Konkatedra św. Aleksandra, Suwałki (St. Alexander Concathedral)
 Minor Basilica:  Bazylika Najświętszego Serca Jezusowego, Augustów (Most Holy Heart of Jesus Basilica)

Bishops

 Bishops of Ełk (Roman rite)
 Bishop Wojciech Ziemba (1992.03.25 – 2000.11.16), appointed Archbishop of Białystok 
 Bishop Edward Eugeniusz Samsel (2000.11.16 – 2003.01.17)
 Bishop Jerzy Mazur, S.V.D. (since 2003.04.17)

Auxiliary bishops
Romuald Kamiński (2005-2017), appointed Coadjutor Bishop of Warszawa-Praga
Adrian Józef Galbas, S.A.C. (2020-2022) appointed Coadjutor Archbishop of Katowice
Dariusz Zalewski (since 2022.10.29)

See also
Roman Catholicism in Poland

Sources
 GCatholic.org
 Catholic Hierarchy
 Diocese website

Roman Catholic dioceses in Poland
Christian organizations established in 1992
Roman Catholic dioceses and prelatures established in the 20th century